Malvern High School may refer to:

 Malvern High School (Arkansas), located in Malvern, Arkansas.
 Malvern High School (Ohio), located in Malvern, Ohio.